François Bourdoncle (born 1964) is founder and Chief Strategist of the search engine company Exalead. He is currently president of FB&Cie.

Literature
 Semantic Analysis of Interval Congruences, 1993, Author François Bourdoncle, Springer-Verlag, London, UK.

Formation
Former student from École polytechnique (class of 1984), then from Mines ParisTech, engineer at the Corps des mines, he obtained a doctorate in information technology from École polytechnique in 1992 on the Semantics of imperative languages and higher-order abstract interpretation, under the direction of Patrick Cousot.

Career
He was then a researcher at the Centre of Applied Mathematics from École des mines de Paris, together with the Digital Equipment Corporation research centre in Paris, then directed by Patrick Colas-Baudelaire and Henri Gouraud, where he met Louis Monier. In 1993, he left a year at the Digital Systems Research Center, Digital Equipment Corporation research centre in Palo Alto, where he worked as a researcher. Named Master of research at École des mines in 1994, he was named at the administrative functions by the assistant manager from the research from the school. Bourdoncle was also a part-time teacher at École polytechnique from 1989 to 2003, and at École normale supérieure from 2003 to 2006.

In 1997, on course of a voyage to the United States, he sought Louis Monier who became a technical director of Alta Vista. He spoke to Louis Monier about the problem of the real-time ranking of responses to a request from a user. Louis Monier finding the idea interesting, François Bourdoncle then returned to France, tackled the problem, and found an ultra-rapid algorithm for ranking in non-predefined categories. He negotiated by the suite a contract of $950,000 between Alta Vista and École des mines. François Bourdoncle then presented a research team at École des mines of Paris, recruited his from Patrice Bertin and some PhD students. Even so, the interest of Altavista for the technology to dissipate, and Bourdoncle developed a new motor technology of research which allowed him to co-found the Exalead society with Bertin in 2000. Bourdoncle will have immediately been the society’s CEO, but he wished to abandon his administrative responsibilities beginning in 2008, staying even so director of the society’s strategy.

Exalead was bought by the Dassault Systems society in June 2010 for €136,000,000.

Distinctions
François Bourdoncle had been ranked amongst the ten best French engineers for 2005, according to the ranking established by L’Usine nouvelle, Industry and Technology at the CNISF  (Ingénieurs et scientifiques de France), and has obtained the prize “entrepreneur”. He was named Knight in the National Order of Merit in 2007 and Knight in the order of the Legion of Honour on 1 January 2009.

References

External links

 www.fbcie.com
 www.exalead.com/Francois.Bourdoncle 

Living people
1964 births
Knights of the Ordre national du Mérite
École Polytechnique alumni
Mines Paris - PSL alumni